Bayfield is a village in Saint Philip Parish in Barbados. It has a pond in its center with masked ducks, green herons, common gallinules, and snowy egrets.

References

Populated places in Barbados